Robert Lees (July 3, 1842September 21, 1908) was a Scottish American immigrant, lawyer, judge, and Democratic politician.  He served four years in the Wisconsin State Senate and one year in the State Assembly, and served as county judge of Buffalo County, Wisconsin, for the last 27 years of his life.  During the American Civil War, he served in the famous Iron Brigade of the Army of the Potomac and was badly wounded at the Battle of Gettysburg.

Biography
Lees was born on July 3, 1842, in Coatbridge, Scotland, near Glasgow, in July 1842.  As a child, he emigrated with his parents to the United States in 1848, settling first at Waukesha County, Wisconsin, then moving to Cross township in Buffalo County in 1855.  At the time, Buffalo County was a pioneer community with limited educational opportunities, but studied law under his father, Edward Lees.

Civil War service

At the outbreak of the American Civil War in 1861, he joined up as a private with a company of volunteers for the Union Army.  His company was enrolled as Company H, in the 6th Wisconsin Infantry Regiment.  The 6th Wisconsin Infantry was sent to the eastern theater of the war and organized into a brigade which soon became known as the Iron Brigade of the Army of the Potomac.  Lees served with the regiment through its participation in the major battles of the eastern theater, including Second Bull Run, South Mountain, Antietam, Fredericksburg, Chancellorsville, and Gettysburg, and was promoted to first sergeant in the company.  At Gettysburg, he was severely wounded and taken prisoner by the enemy.  He was subsequently paroled and sent to a Union Army hospital, where he remained until mustered out of federal service in July 1864.

Political career

After being discharged, Lees returned to Buffalo County and established a home in Gilmantown.  His wounds left him incapable of farm work, so he devoted the next several years to teaching at rural schools and was subsequently elected superintendent of schools for Buffalo County.

Lees became active with the Democratic Party of Wisconsin.  In 1872, he won election to the Wisconsin State Assembly, representing Buffalo County's Assembly district.  He continued studying law and was admitted to the bar shortly after his Assembly term.  In 1881, he was elected county judge of Buffalo County, and was subsequently re-elected in 1885, 1889, 1893, 1897, 1901, and 1905.  While serving as judge, he was elected to the Wisconsin State Senate in 1890 in Wisconsin's 29th State Senate district, then-comprising Buffalo, Barron, Dunn, and Pepin counties.  He was not a candidate for re-election to the Senate in 1894.  He served as county judge for the rest of his life.

Lees suffered a Stroke in September 1908, and died a few days later at his home in Alma, Wisconsin.

Personal life and family
Robert Lees was the son of Edward Lees.  Edward Lees was also a self-taught lawyer and served four terms in the Wisconsin State Assembly.  On March 4, 1865, Robert Lees married Mary Baertsch, the daughter of another family of Buffalo County pioneers.  They had six children together.

Their eldest son, Edward, became a lawyer in Winona, Minnesota, and served as court commissioner of the Minnesota Supreme Court for 10 years.  Another son, Andrew, became a prominent attorney in La Crosse, Wisconsin.

Robert Lees was described as a friend of Edward S. Bragg, who had been colonel of the 6th Wisconsin Infantry and later served as a U.S. congressman and a leader of the Democratic Party of Wisconsin.  In Bragg's final bid for election to the United States Senate in 1893, Lees was the sole vote for Bragg in the official tabulation.

Electoral history

Wisconsin Assembly (1872)

| colspan="6" style="text-align:center;background-color: #e9e9e9;"| General Election, November 5, 1872

Wisconsin Senate (1890)

| colspan="6" style="text-align:center;background-color: #e9e9e9;"| General Election, November 4, 1890

References

External links

People from Coatbridge
Scottish emigrants to the United States
People from Alma, Wisconsin
Democratic Party Wisconsin state senators
Democratic Party members of the Wisconsin State Assembly
Wisconsin state court judges
School board members in Wisconsin
People of Wisconsin in the American Civil War
Union Army soldiers
1842 births
1908 deaths
19th-century American politicians
19th-century American judges
Politicians from North Lanarkshire